Mario Innauer  (born 10 January 1990) is an Austrian former ski jumper. He is the son of Olympic gold medalist Toni Innauer.

Mario Innauer's best World Cup result was reached in 2007 in Titisee-Neustadt, where he came in fifth.

After an injury in 2011 he continued to jump into 2013 when he announced his retirement from the sport.

References

External links
 FIS profile - 
 Retirement announcement - 

1990 births
Living people
Austrian male ski jumpers
Sportspeople from Graz